Ritala Spur is a mostly snow-covered spur extending northeast from the east side of Lexington Table, Forrestal Range, in the Pensacola Mountains. Named by Advisory Committee on Antarctic Names (US-ACAN) in 1979 after Keith E. Ritala, United States Antarctic Research Program (USARP) geophysicist who conducted gravity research at South Pole Station, winter party 1972.
 

Ridges of Queen Elizabeth Land